Anna Charlotte Hellekant (born 15 January 1962 in Stockholm) is a Swedish operatic mezzo-soprano.

Hellekant studied at the Philadelphia and New York conservatories. She began her career in 1989 and played among others Dido, Ariadne auf Naxos, Cherubino in The Marriage of Figaro and Dorabella in Così fan tutte on American stages.

References

External links 
 Charlotte Hellekant
 

Swedish operatic mezzo-sopranos
1962 births
Living people
Singers from Stockholm
20th-century Swedish women  opera singers
21st-century Swedish women  opera singers